Finland participated in the Eurovision Song Contest 2005 with the song "Why?" written by Mika Toivanen and Steven Stewart. The song was performed by Geir Rönning. The Finnish broadcaster Yleisradio (Yle) organised the national final Euroviisut 2005 in order to select the Finnish entry for the 2005 contest in Kyiv, Ukraine. 24 entries were selected to compete in the national final, which consisted of four semi-finals and a final, taking place in January and February 2005. Six entries competed in each semi-final and the top three from each semi-final, as selected solely by a public vote, advanced to the final. Twelve entries competed in the final on 19 February where votes from six regional juries first selected the top six to advance to a second round. In the second round, votes from the public selected "Why?" performed by Geir Rönning as the winner with 30,648 votes.

Finland competed in the semi-final of the Eurovision Song Contest which took place on 19 May 2005. Performing during the show in position 16, "Why?" was not announced among the top 10 entries of the semi-final and therefore did not qualify to compete in the final. It was later revealed that Finland placed eighteenth out of the 25 participating countries in the semi-final with 50 points.

Background 

Prior to the 2005 contest, Finland had participated in the Eurovision Song Contest thirty-eight times since its first entry in 1961. Finland's best result in the contest achieved in 1973 where the song "Tom Tom Tom" performed by Marion Rung placed sixth.

The Finnish national broadcaster, Yleisradio (Yle), broadcasts the event within Finland and organises the selection process for the nation's entry. Yle confirmed their intentions to participate at the 2005 Eurovision Song Contest on 22 June 2004. Finland's entries for the Eurovision Song Contest have been selected through national final competitions that have varied in format over the years. Since 1961, a selection show that was often titled Euroviisukarsinta highlighted that the purpose of the program was to select a song for Eurovision. Along with their participation confirmation, the broadcaster announced that the Finnish entry for the 2005 contest would be selected through the Euroviisut selection show.

Before Eurovision

Euroviisut 2005 
Euroviisut 2005 was the national final that selected Finland's entry for the Eurovision Song Contest 2005. The competition consisted of five shows that commenced with the first of four semi-finals on 14 January 2005 and concluded with a final on 19 February 2005. All shows were broadcast on Yle TV2 and via radio on Yle Radio Vega. The final was also broadcast via radio on Yle Radio Suomi.

Format 
The format of the competition consisted of five shows: four semi-finals and a final. Six songs competed in each semi-final and the top three entries from each semi-final qualified to complete the twelve-song lineup in the final. The results for the semi-finals were determined exclusively by a public vote, while the results in the final were determined by public voting and jury voting. Public voting included the options of telephone and SMS.

Competing entries 
A submission period was opened by Yle which lasted between 22 June 2004 and 1 October 2004. Both the writers and singer(s) had to hold Finnish citizenship or live in Finland permanently in order for the entry to qualify to compete. Song performed in Finnish or Swedish were preferred. A panel of twelve experts appointed by Yle selected sixteen entries for the competition from a record number of 503 received submissions, while an additional eight entries came from composers directly invited by Yle: Maki Kolehmainen, Samuli Laiho, Kristian Maukonen, Petri Munck, Esa Nieminen, Sipe Santapukki, Mikko Tamminen and Arttu Peljo, and Mika Toivanen. The experts were Ilkka Talasranta (Head of Entertainment at Yle), Kjell Ekholm (Director of Entertainment at Yle FST), Jukka Haarma (Director of Popular Music at Yle Radio Suomi), Mikko Harjunp (music director of Radio Nova), Jorma Hietamäki (music director of Yle Radio Suomi), Asko Kallonen (record producer), Hannu Korkeamäki (record producer), Pirkko Kotirinta (editor at Helsingin Sanomat), Pia Ljungman (producer at YLEXQ), Asko Murtomäki (Eurovision expert), Rainer Savander (music director of Sävelradio) and Laura Voutilainen (singer). The competing entries were presented on 1 November 2004. 

Prior to the competition, "I Can't Believe It", written by Patrick Linman and Ola Larsson, was disqualified due to the song having been released on a compilation album in Sweden and replaced with "Kihlaus" performed by Wäinötär. The song "Du ger kärleken ett svar" performed by Geir Rönning and Nina Tapio was translated from Swedish to English and titled "My One and Only Love", while "Joo joo" performed by I'Dees was translated from Finnish to English and titled "Yeah, yeah".

Shows

Semi-finals
The four semi-final shows took place on 14 January, 21 January, 4 February and 11 February 2005, hosted by Finnish presenters Jaana Pelkonen and Heikki Paasonen. The semi-finals took place in different cities across Finland: the Sibelius Hall in Lahti for the first semi-final, the Paviljonki in Jyväskylä for the second semi-final, Hall 994 of the Holiday Club Caribia in Turku for the third semi-final and the Kulttuurikeskus in Imatra for the fourth semi-final. The top three from the six competing entries in each semi-final qualified to the final based on the results from the public vote, which were revealed by Finland's five telephone regions along with the SMS voting results. In addition to the competing entries, Boney M, Frederik and 2002 Finnish Eurovision entrant Laura performed as the interval acts in all four semi-finals.

Final 
The final took place on 19 February 2005 at the Tampere Hall in Tampere, hosted by Finnish presenters Jaana Pelkonen, Heikki Paasonen and Antero Mertaranta. The twelve entries that qualified from the preceding four semi-finals competed and the winner was selected over two rounds of voting. In the first round, the top six from the twelve competing entries qualified to the second round based on the votes of six regional juries. Each jury group distributed their points as follows: 1, 2, 4, 6, 8 and 10 points. In the second round, "Why?" performed by Geir Rönning was selected as the winner based on the results from the public vote, which were revealed by Finland's five telephone regions along with the SMS voting results. A total of 122,008 votes were cast in the superfinal: 67,257 through telephone and 54,751 through SMS. In addition to the performances of the competing entries, the interval act featured Frederik, 2002 Finnish Eurovision entrant Laura and 2004 Finnish Eurovision entrant Jari Sillanpää.

At Eurovision 
According to Eurovision rules, all nations with the exceptions of the host country, the "Big Four" (France, Germany, Spain and the United Kingdom) and the ten highest placed finishers in the 2004 contest are required to qualify from the semi-final on 19 May 2005 in order to compete for the final on 21 May 2005; the top ten countries from the semi-final progress to the final. On 22 March 2005, a special allocation draw was held which determined the running order for the semi-final and Finland was set to perform in position 16, following the entry from Hungary and before the entry from Macedonia. At the end of the semi-final, Finland was not announced among the top 10 entries and therefore failed to qualify to compete in the final. It was later revealed that Finland placed eighteenth in the semi-final, receiving a total of 50 points.

The semi-final and the final were televised in Finland on Yle TV2 with commentary in Finnish by Jaana Pelkonen, Heikki Paasonen and Asko Murtomäki. The three shows were also broadcast on Yle FST with commentary in Swedish by Thomas Lundin as well as via radio with Finnish commentary by Sanna Pirkkalainen and Jorma Hietamäki on Yle Radio Suomi. The Finnish spokesperson, who announced the Finnish votes during the final, was 2004 Finnish Eurovision entrant Jari Sillanpää.

Voting 
Below is a breakdown of points awarded to Finland and awarded by Finland in the semi-final and grand final of the contest. The nation awarded its 12 points to Norway in the semi-final and the final of the contest.

Points awarded to Finland

Points awarded by Finland

References

External links
  Full national final on Yle Elävä Arkisto

2005
Countries in the Eurovision Song Contest 2005
Eurovision
Eurovision